Timothy Lester Woodruff (August 4, 1858 – October 12, 1913) was an American businessman and politician. A leader of the Republican Party in the state of New York, Woodruff is best remembered for having been elected three terms as the Lieutenant Governor of the state, serving in that capacity from 1897 to 1902.

Biography

Early years
Timothy Woodruff was born August 4, 1858, in New Haven, Connecticut. He was the son of a United States Congressman, Rep. John Woodruff and his wife, the former Harriet Jane Lester.

Woodruff graduated from Yale College in 1879, where he was a member of the secret society Skull and Bones. Following graduation from Yale, Woodruff enrolled in Eastman Business College of Poughkeepsie, New York, in preparation for a career in business and commerce. In 1880 he married Cora Eastman, the daughter of the school's founder.

After leaving Eastman's College, Woodruff went to New York City where he was hired as a clerk for a wholesale salt supplier. Within a year Woodruff was made a partner in the firm. Woodruff also became involved in warehousing on the Brooklyn waterfront, gaining a controlling interest in several commercial frontages and two grain elevators. This warehousing operation was consolidated in January 1888 as the Empire Warehouse Company, which in turn became the Brooklyn Grain Warehouse Company in May 1889.

Woodruff maintained other commercial interests as well, serving as president and principal proprietor of the Maltine Manufacturing Company, as president of the Smith Premier Typewriter Company, and as a director of the Merchants' Exchange National Bank.

As a prosperous businessman and avid fisherman Woodruff found himself with the means to purchase land and a summer cabin on Sumner Lake in the Adirondacks near the Hamilton County town of Long Lake. Woodruff later purchased additional land in the Adirondacks, where he developed a popular commercial camp called Kamp Kill Kare.

Political career

In 1881, Woodruff entered politics as a member of the Brooklyn Young Republicans, working for the successful election of Seth Low as Mayor of Brooklyn. Woodruff rose through the party ranks, being elected as a delegate to the 1888 Republican National Convention which nominated Benjamin Harrison for President.

Woodruff was elected to the New York Republican State Committee in 1889, serving in that capacity until 1890. He eventually became the head of the party's organization in Kings County, New York, and later Chairman of the New York State Republican Committee.

In January 1896, Woodruff was appointed Brooklyn Park Commissioner, in which capacity he was an early leader in the construction of bicycle paths, constructing routes from Prospect Park to Coney Island. In 1896, Woodruff petitioned to the New York State Board of Regents to create a "coeducational college" in Brooklyn.

Woodruff was elected three times as Lieutenant Governor of New York and served from 1897 to 1902. In the process Woodruff became the only Lieutenant Governor in New York history to serve under three different Governors — Frank S. Black, Theodore Roosevelt, and Benjamin Barker Odell, Jr. As Lieutenant Governor, Woodruff took a leadership role in the Association for the Protection of the Adirondacks, helping to protect the forests there from the devastation of clear cutting and large scale damming projects.  He was president of the New York State Agricultural Society in 1900.

Later years
In 1904, Woodruff's wife Cora died. He was remarried the next year to the former Isabel Morrison of New York City.

From 1896 to 1908, Woodruff served as the First President of the Adelphi College Board of Trustees. In 1908 Woodruff stepped down from the presidency but he remained an active member until his death in 1913.

Death and legacy
Timothy Woodruff died on October 12, 1913. Recalling his days as New York State Governor, Theodore Roosevelt stated "He was my staunch friend throughout the term of our joint service."

A collection of Woodruff's correspondence with his father is housed at the Yale University Library in New Haven, Connecticut. Included are 13 reels of microfilm which include 11,643 frames of published and unpublished material documenting Woodruff's career.

Footnotes

External links
 Timothy Lester Woodruff Family Papers (MS 1229). Manuscripts and Archives, Yale University Library.
Guide to the Timothy Lester Woodruff Papers 1897-1909 at the University of Chicago Special Collections Research Center

Lieutenant Governors of New York (state)
Politicians from Brooklyn
New York (state) Republicans
American conservationists
Adelphi University people
Eastman Business College alumni
Yale College alumni
Businesspeople from New Haven, Connecticut
1858 births
1913 deaths
19th-century American politicians
19th-century American businesspeople